State Route 30 (SR 30) is a  state highway in Barbour County in the southeastern part of the U.S. state of Alabama. The western terminus of the highway is at an intersection with SR 51 at Clayton. The route continues until its intersection with U.S. Route 431 (US 431) south of Eufaula.

Route description

SR 30 is routed along a two-lane roadway for its entire length. It serves as a connector route between Clayton, the county seat of Barbour County, and Eufaula, the county’s largest city and primary center of retail. Between the two cities, the highway travels through rural areas with no cities or towns. After intersecting two minor state routes at Clayton, the highway does not intersect any other state routes or U.S. highways until its terminus south of Eufaula.

Major intersections

See also

References

030
Transportation in Barbour County, Alabama